Alex Chambers (born 28 October 1978) is an Australian mixed martial artist who competes in the Strawweight division. A professional mixed martial artist since 2010, she has also fought in the Ultimate Fighting Championship and Invicta FC. She was also a contestant on The Ultimate Fighter: A Champion Will Be Crowned.

Mixed martial arts career

Early career
Chambers started learning karate when she was a child. By the time she was in university, she held a 3rd dan in karate and was competing on an international stage.

Chambers discovered her first (and current) MMA gym through the MMA Underground Forums. Under her gym's tutelage, she was able to become a BJJ national champion before she made her professional MMA debut in May 2010 for the Rize promotion in Australia. It was the first female MMA bout to ever take place in New South Wales state history. She won her debut as well as a subsequent bout which happened around two months later.

After a period of dormancy in 2011, Chambers returned in March 2012 to fight for the Jewels promotion in Japan. She faced Mizuki Inoue and lost the fight via submission. Chambers then returned to Australia to fight in the Brace For War promotion where she was featured as main event on Brace's first ever all female card. She defeated Mika Nagano by TKO on the card.

Invicta Fighting championships
In 2013, Chambers signed with the Invicta FC promotion. She made her US debut on 5 April 2013 at Invicta FC 5 in an atomweight bout. She defeated Jodie Esquibel by submission early in the first round.

Ultimate Fighting Championship

The Ultimate Fighter
On 11 December 2013, it was announced that Chambers was signed by the UFC along with ten other strawweight fighters to compete on The Ultimate Fighter: A Champion Will Be Crowned, which will crown the first ever UFC strawweight champion.

In the first episode, it was revealed that the UFC had seeded the fighters. Chambers was seeded 10th of 16 fighters and was paired with the no. 7 seed, Rose Namajunas. Namajunas was picked fourth by Team Melendez, thereby sending Chambers to Team Pettis. In their fight, she lost the bout via submission in the first round.

After TUF
In her first fight after The Ultimate Fighter, Chambers faced Aisling Daly at The Ultimate Fighter: A Champion Will Be Crowned Finale on 12 December 2014. She lost the fight via submission in the first round.

Chambers faced Kailin Curran on 10 May 2015 at UFC Fight Night 65. After losing the first two rounds, Chambers came back in the third round to win via submission. The win also earned Chambers her first Performance of the Night bonus award.

Chambers faced Paige VanZant on 5 September 2015 at UFC 191. She lost the fight via submission in the third round.

Chambers faced Nadia Kassem at UFC Fight Night: Werdum vs. Tybura on 19 November 2017 in Sydney, Australia. At the weight-ins, Kassem weighed in at 120 pounds, 4 pounds over the strawweight upper limit of 116 pounds. The bout proceeded at a catchweight and Kassem forfeited 30% of her purse to Chambers. Chambers lost the fight by unanimous decision.

Chambers faced Lívia Renata Souza on 22 September 2018 at UFC Fight Night 137. She lost the fight via a guillotine choke in round one.

In February 2021, it was reported that Chambers and UFC had parted ways.

Personal life
Before becoming a professional MMA fighter, Chambers attended the University of Sydney where she did a double degree in science and mechatronics engineering. Chambers aspired to become an astrophysicist or a robotics engineer before discovering her love for MMA.

Chambers trained at the same gym as fellow UFC fighter and TUF alumni Richard Walsh for seven years.

Championships and accomplishments
 Ultimate Fighting Championship
 Performance of the Night (One time) vs. Kailin Curran

Mixed martial arts record

|-
|Loss
|align=center|5–5
|Lívia Renata Souza
|Submission (guillotine choke)
|UFC Fight Night: Santos vs. Anders
|
|align=center|1
|align=center|1:21
|São Paulo, Brazil
|
|-
|Loss
|align=center|5–4
|Nadia Kassem
|Decision (unanimous)
|UFC Fight Night: Werdum vs. Tybura
|
|align=center|3
|align=center|5:00
|Sydney, Australia
|
|-
|Loss
|align=center|5–3
|Paige VanZant
|Submission (armbar)
|UFC 191
|
|align=center|3
|align=center|1:01
|Las Vegas, Nevada, United States
|
|-
|Win
|align=center|5–2
|Kailin Curran
|Submission (armbar)
|UFC Fight Night: Miocic vs. Hunt
|
|align=center|3
|align=center|3:15
|Adelaide, Australia
|
|-
|Loss
|align=center|4–2
|Aisling Daly
|Submission (armbar)
|The Ultimate Fighter: A Champion Will Be Crowned Finale
|
|align=center|1
|align=center|4:53
|Las Vegas, Nevada, United States
|
|-
|Win
|align=center |4–1
|Jodie Esquibel
|Submission (rear-naked choke)
|Invicta FC 5: Penne vs. Waterson
|
|align=center | 1
|align=center | 1:35
|Kansas City, Missouri, United States
|
|-
|Win
|align=center |3–1
|Mika Nagano
|TKO (knee and punches)
|BFW 17: Brace Girls
|
|align=center | 1
|align=center | 0:42
|Southport, Australia
|
|-
|Loss
|align=center |2–1
|Mizuki Inoue
|Submission (armbar)
|Jewels 18th Ring
|
|align=center | 1
|align=center | 4:32
|Tokyo, Japan
|
|-
|Win
|align=center |2–0
|Claire Fryer
|TKO (punches)
|Rize 6: Defiance
|
|align=center | 1
|align=center | 2:57
|Chandler, Australia
|
|-
|Win
|align=center |1–0
|Jessica Tolhurst
|Decision (unanimous)
|Rize 5: Revolution
|
|align=center | 3
|align=center | 3:00
|Chandler, Australia
|
|-
|}

Mixed martial arts exhibition record

|-
|Loss
|align=center|0–1
| Rose Namajunas
| Submission (rear-naked choke)
| The Ultimate Fighter: A Champion Will Be Crowned
| (airdate)
|align=center|1
|align=center|4:38
|Las Vegas, Nevada, United States
|

See also
 List of female mixed martial artists

References

External links
 Alex Chambers at Awakening Fighters
 
 

1978 births
Living people
Sportspeople from Sydney
Sportswomen from New South Wales
Australian female karateka
Australian astrophysicists
Australian female mixed martial artists
Strawweight mixed martial artists
Atomweight mixed martial artists
Mixed martial artists utilizing karate
Mixed martial artists utilizing Brazilian jiu-jitsu
University of Sydney alumni
Ultimate Fighting Championship female fighters
Australian practitioners of Brazilian jiu-jitsu
Female Brazilian jiu-jitsu practitioners